Break of Hearts is a 1935 RKO film starring Katharine Hepburn and Charles Boyer.  The screenplay was written by the team of Sarah Y. Mason and Victor Heerman, with Anthony Veiller,  from a story by Lester Cohen, specifically for Hepburn.

Originally Break of Hearts was intended as a vehicle for Hepburn and John Barrymore. The film was promoted by RKO's advertising department with the catch phrase: "The star of a million moods together with the new idol of the screen." (Francis Lederer actually was first signed-up lead, but the producers replaced him with Charles Boyer.)

Plot summary

Franz Roberti (Charles Boyer) is a passionate and eminent musical conductor; Constance Dane (Katharine Hepburn) is an aspiring but unknown composer. She wants to see his concert, but it is all sold out. When she sneaks into his rehearsal he is smitten by her devotion and gets his orchestra to get it right as they play just for her. Constance marries Franz: he says she is "a most exciting creature" and she has been in love with him for a long time (i.e., "since late this afternoon").

Not long after they get married Constance finds Franz having dinner with a female friend. So Constance responds by going out with her own friend, Johnny Lawrence (John Beal). Johnny wants to marry Constance, but she cannot forget her husband. Franz has been hitting the bottle and pretty much throwing away his career, although exactly which of his many sins is driving him to drink is not really clear. Fortunately, Constance has been working on her concerto.

Cast
 Katharine Hepburn as Constance Dane Roberti
 Charles Boyer as Franz Roberti
 John Beal as Johnny Lawrence
 Jean Hersholt as Professor Thalma
 Sam Hardy as Marx
 Inez Courtney as Miss Wilson
 Helene Millard as Sylvia DeWitt
 Ferdinand Gottschalk as Enrico Pazzini
 Susan Fleming as Elise
 Lee Kohlmar as Schubert
 Jean Howard as Didi Smith-Lennox
 Anne Grey as Lady Phyllis Cameron

Reception
Writing for The Spectator, Graham Greene praised the acting of Boyer and Hepburn which he described as "talented enough to keep some of our interest even in a story of this kind". Concerning Hepburn in particular, Greene observed she "always makes her young women quite horrifyingly lifelike with their girlish intuitions, their intensity, their ideals which destroy the edge of human pleasure".

This film made a slim profit of $16,000.

References

External links 
 
 
 
 

1935 films
American black-and-white films
RKO Pictures films
American romantic drama films
Films about composers
1935 romantic drama films
1930s American films